Ufomba Kamalu (born November 2, 1992) is an American football defensive end for the BC Lions of the Canadian Football League (CFL). He played college football at the University of Miami and signed with the Houston Texans as an undrafted free agent in 2016. He won a Super Bowl ring with the 2018 New England Patriots.

Early life
After being born in California, Kamalu spent the first 13 years of his life in Aba, Nigeria with his siblings, while his parents stayed back home. He returned to the United States for high school, but many concepts in America were completely foreign to him. It has been reported that by his father's request he began playing football his freshman year of high school.

College career
Kamalu went to Butler Community College in El Dorado, Kansas for junior college. He then attended college at University of Miami in Florida, playing football, where he totaled 48 tackles (11.5 for a loss of yardage), 8.0 sacks, one forced fumble and fumble recovery, and an interception which he returned for 46 yards over his 3-year collegiate career. Kamalu was voted Miami's defensive player of the year during his senior year in 2015 After 4 years of college with Butler CC and Miami combined, he declared for the 2016 NFL draft where he went undrafted.

Professional career

Houston Texans
Kamalu signed with the Houston Texans as an undrafted free agent on May 5, 2016. He was waived by the Texans on September 3, 2016 and was signed to the practice squad the next day. He was promoted to the active roster on November 26, 2016. He made his professional debut in Week 13 in a start against the Green Bay Packers, where he recorded his first career tackle in a 21-13 loss. Kamalu recorded his first career sack on Matt Cassel in a Week 17 loss to the Tennessee Titans.

On September 1, 2018, Kamalu was waived by the Texans.

Arizona Cardinals
On September 25, 2018, Kamalu was signed to the Arizona Cardinals' practice squad. He was released on October 30, 2018.

New England Patriots
On November 5, 2018, Kamalu was signed to the New England Patriots' practice squad. He was promoted to the active roster on December 21, 2018. Kamalu appeared in 2 games for the Patriots recording 1 tackle. With Kamalu the Patriots reached Super Bowl LIII and defeated the Los Angeles Rams 13-3.

On August 31, 2019, Kamalu was released during final roster cuts. He was signed onto the Patriots practice squad a day later.

Baltimore Ravens  
On October 24, 2019, Kamalu was signed by the Baltimore Ravens off the Patriots' practice squad. He was waived on November 12 and re-signed to the practice squad. He signed a reserve/future contract with the Ravens on January 13, 2020. He was released by the Ravens on April 8, 2020. The next day Kamalu was arrested on a warrant for domestic violence. The woman showed visible signs of injury. The young lady tried to get justice but Ufomba Kamalu, along with his attorney Benjamin Herbst (of The Herbst Firm in Baltimore) allegedly silenced her. Benjamin Herbst allegedly called the young lady in question to bail Ufomba Kamalu out of jail, but she was afraid and did not want to do so. So attorney Benjamin Herbst found another person to allegedly sign for his bail. The young lady reported Benjamin Herbst to the Maryland Bar. He was suspended by the NFL for the remainder of the 2020 NFL regular season and postseason on December 11, 2020, and reinstated from suspension on February 8, 2021.

BC Lions
Despite his alleged history with domestic violence, Kamalu managed to signed with the BC Lions of the CFL on December 30, 2020. He was released then added to the practice roster for the October 6th game against the Calgary Stampeders. Kamalu released Then was he released by the BC Lions completely and is currently a free agent in the CFL.

References

Living people
1992 births
American football defensive ends
American sportspeople of Nigerian descent
Arizona Cardinals players
Baltimore Ravens players
BC Lions players
Butler Grizzlies football players
Houston Texans players
Miami Hurricanes football players
New England Patriots players
Nigerian players of American football
People from Aba, Abia
People from Fayetteville, Georgia
Players of American football from Georgia (U.S. state)
Sportspeople from Abia State
Sportspeople from the Atlanta metropolitan area